Ise Forest Reserve is located in Ekiti State, southwestern Nigeria, covering 142 km. The estimate terrain elevation above sea level is 366 metres.

This is a habitat for about 661 species of butterflies. There is also a large community of chimpanzees.

References

Forest Reserves of Nigeria